is a hybrid edutainment/minigame compilation video game developed and released in Japan for the Nintendo DS by Namco Bandai Games in 2007.

Gameplay

Mizuiro Blood is a hybrid edutainment/minigame compilation video game. The player controls the feminine robot Mizuiro through her school year at the Blood Academy, where she attempts to both graduate and win the respect of her love interest, the siren-donning robot Kato. The game is divided into eight stages, each representing a month of the school year. In these levels, Mizuiro must complete a series of minigames that are controlled through the system's stylus pen. Minigames range from writing puns in katakana and hiragana, to word puzzles similar to shiritori, to completing rhythm game sequences reminiscent of Taiko no Tatsujin. These minigames are time-based and must be completed as quickly as possible. Should the player fail, they are shown a cutscene of Mizuiro being violently killed, such as getting sliced in half, crushed by a 16-ton weight, or being skewered by a pole. Completing a minigame will award a bronze, silver, or gold medal, depending on how well the player did. Earning a certain amount of medals allows the player to earn a trophy, some of which are based on older Namco video games, such as Rally-X (1980) and Xevious (1983).

Reception

Famitsu staff awarded Mizuiro Blood the Gold Hall of Fame award. One reviewer was surprised by its dark storyline, especially in comparison to the cute designs of the characters, believing this aspect would only appeal to certain age demographics. Another reviewer praised the minigames for being fresh and having variety, though another was unimpressed with the small amount of them. Dai Kohama of Play almost found it arbitrary to give the game a proper score due to its bizarre presentation, which he found strange "even for authentic Japanese people". He believed the quality of the minigames and the strangeness made it worth owning, though noted its extensive use of Japanese and the DS sometimes being unable to recognize the handwriting.

Notes

References

2007 video games
Bandai Namco games
Educational video games
Japan-exclusive video games
Minigame compilations
Nintendo DS games
Nintendo DS-only games
Video games developed in Japan